Francis T. "Mickey" Featherstone (born September 2, 1948) is a former Irish American mobster and member of the Westies, an organized crime syndicate from Hell's Kitchen, Manhattan in New York City, led by James Coonan. Featherstone committed several mob killings before he was convicted in 1986 of a murder he had not committed. Facing almost 25 years in jail, he became an informant and brought down Coonan's gang.

Early life
Featherstone was born on West 43rd St., one of nine children. His mother helped with the Veterans of Foreign Wars and his father was a United States Customs Service officer. He had blond hair and was often said to be baby-faced. He served in the Vietnam War as member of the Green Berets aged just 17 after lying about his age. He served in heavy combat and then as a stock clerk. To his disappointment, he was pulled from combat duty,  he was involved in criminal mischief with his friends and was disciplined for many drunken pranks. He received a medical discharge in 1967 after just a year, claiming to have hallucinations.

Return to Hell's Kitchen
When a group from New Jersey, called the Riley brothers, entered Hell's Kitchen a fight started with the outsiders. Featherstone returned with a rifle and shot one of the brothers John Riley in the arm, for which he was arrested and probationed. After borrowing Coonan's gun, he shot dead Linwood Willis in a confrontation outside a bar in 1971, but was found not guilty due to insanity. He spent time in a series of mental hospitals, being released in 1975. He would act out frequently while in the hospitals, leading to him being restrained and injected with thorazine. He began spending time in saloons like Club 596 and Sunbrite that were hangouts for the Westies.

The Westies
Featherstone's penchant for violence and intimidation caught the eye of Coonan and Featherstone became Coonan's right-hand man by 1976. Mickey Spillane, the mob leader in Hell's Kitchen at the time, was shot five times outside his apartment in August 1977, and Featherstone was arrested but acquitted for his killing. The police suspected him of a series of mob contract killings. He went on trial with Coonan for the killing of a barman, but they were acquitted in December 1979 after one witness killed himself and another refused to testify. His conviction eventually came in February 1982, after using counterfeit currency at a massage parlor - he was traced because the girl remembered seeing his name tattooed on his forearm, and he was sentenced to six years. Featherstone did time in the Medical Center for Federal Prisoners in Springfield Missouri on the psychiatric ward in 1982. He was a model prisoner, seen daily picking fine lint off of his perfectly made bunk to pass inspection, and starting arguments with others for not polishing their door frame brass. The institution kept Featherstone working on the ward, out of General Population, for his own safety.

Featherstone and Coonan had a falling out over the latter's alliance with the Gambino crime family, which Featherstone saw as a betrayal of all the Irish-Americans in Hell's Kitchen.

Turning informer
Featherstone was convicted in March 1986 for the April 1985 murder of Michael Holly, despite being innocent of this particular murder, which was a revenge attack probably carried out by another of the Westies, Billy Bokun. He was shocked at receiving his sentence of 25 years in prison, and concluded that he had been framed by his own gang. Rather than serving his sentence he instead told prosecutors that Bokun had committed the murder, and he became an informant. His wife Sissy co-operated with the District Attorney's office to tape incriminating conversations with gang members, including Bokun. In September 1986, Judge Alvin Schlesinger overturned Featherstone's conviction. His testimony at Coonan's racketeering trial during 1987–88 helped to bring down Coonan's gang. He pleaded guilty to a racketeering charge and received a suspended sentence of five years' probation from Judge Robert W. Sweet due to his cooperation with the authorities. He was freed in December 1988 and went into a witness protection program.

References

Further reading
Davis, John H. Mafia Dynasty: The Rise and Fall of the Gambino Crime Family. New York: HarperCollins, 1993.
English, T.J. The Westies. St. Martin's Paperbacks, 1991. 
_. Paddy Whacked: The Untold Story of the Irish American Gangster. New York: HarperCollins Publishers Inc., 2005. 
Mustaine, Gene. Murder Machine. Onyx Books, 1993

1947 births
Living people
American gangsters of Irish descent
American gangsters
United States Army personnel of the Vietnam War
People from Hell's Kitchen, Manhattan
Westies (New York gang)
People with schizophrenia
People acquitted by reason of insanity
People who entered the United States Federal Witness Protection Program
Overturned convictions in the United States
United States Army soldiers
Criminals from Manhattan
Gangsters from New York City